The 2012 SDA Tennis Open was a professional tennis tournament played on clay courts. It was the first edition of the tournament which was part of the 2012 ATP Challenger Tour. It took place in Bercuit, Belgium between 16 and 22 July 2012.

Singles main draw entrants

Seeds

 1 Rankings are as of July 9, 2012.

Other entrants
The following players received wildcards into the singles main draw:
  Arthur De Greef
  Germain Gigounon
  Dimitar Grabuloski
  Yannik Reuter

The following players received entry as a special exempt into the singles main draw:
  Matwé Middelkoop

The following players received entry from the qualifying draw:
  Markus Eriksson
  Alexandre Folie
  Riccardo Maiga
  Daniel Smethurst

Champions

Singles

 Thiemo de Bakker def.  Victor Hănescu, 6–4, 3–6, 7–5

Doubles

 André Ghem /  Marco Trungelliti def.  Facundo Bagnis /  Pablo Galdón, 6–1, 6–2

External links
Official Website

SDA Tennis Open
SDA Tennis Open
Grez-Doiceau
2012 in Belgian tennis